The Division of Stirling was an Australian electoral division in the inner northern and beachside suburbs of Perth, Western Australia, which included a large portion of the local government area of the City of Stirling.

History

The electorate was created in the Western Australia redistribution of 10 August 1955, and was named after Sir James Stirling, the 19th-century founding lieutenant governor and governor of Western Australia. Stirling covered a demographically diverse area, including several affluent beachside suburbs, as well as working class areas further inland. As a result, Stirling was often a marginal seat, alternating between the Australian Labor Party and the Liberal Party of Australia.

Unlike some marginal seats on the east coast, such as Eden-Monaro, Stirling was not often seen as a reliable barometer for winning government. For example, longtime Labor member Harry Webb survived the massive Coalition landslide of 1966, only to become one of two Labor MPs from the state to be defeated in 1972 even as Labor ended 23 years of Coalition rule. While it elected five government MPs, all but three of its members have spent at least one term in opposition.

Besides Webb, who held the seat for all but one term from its creation in 1955 until his defeat in 1972, the seat's most prominent member was Labor's Ron Edwards, who was Deputy Speaker of the House of Representatives from 29 August 1989 to 8 February 1993.  It had been expected that if the 1993 election had not been called so soon after Leo McLeay's resignation as Speaker or if Edwards had held his seat in the election upon the re-election of the Keating Government, Edwards would have been elected Speaker.

Opinion polls in the leadup to the 2004 election had suggested a close result in Stirling, leaning towards the possibility of sitting Labor member Jann McFarlane retaining her seat. This was thought to have been more likely after Paul Afkos, the original Liberal candidate, was forced to resign after he was revealed to have borrowed money from a convicted drug dealer. A local businessman, Michael Keenan, was brought in as his replacement, and maintained the close difference in polling. However, on election day, the swing to the Liberal Party both statewide and nationwide was stronger than expected, and Keenan was ultimately successful in unseating McFarlane. The Stirling Times, a local newspaper, speculated in October 2006 that McFarlane, at that time a Stirling councillor, might contest the seat again in 2007. On 28 November 2006, former SAS officer and outspoken opponent of the Iraq War Peter Tinley accepted an offer from Kim Beazley to run as the ALP candidate in the 2007 election. Ahead of the 2010 election, Labor preselected Louise Durack, a social worker and executive director of People With Disabilities (WA) and past candidate for the state seat of Ocean Reef, to run for the seat. Keenan was re-elected at the 2010 federal election.

It was confirmed in June 2021 that this division would be abolished at the 2022 federal election, with its area redistributed to the neighbouring divisions of Cowan, Curtin, Moore and Perth.

Geography
Since 1984, federal electoral division boundaries in Australia have been determined at redistributions by a redistribution committee appointed by the Australian Electoral Commission. Redistributions occur for the boundaries of divisions in a particular state, and they occur every seven years, or sooner if a state's representation entitlement changes or when divisions of a state are malapportioned.

The division included the northern majority of the City of Stirling and a small portion of the City of Bayswater. Suburbs included

 Balcatta
 Balga 
 Carine 
 Dianella (part)
 Gwelup 
 Hamersley 
 Joondanna
 Karrinyup (part)
 Mirrabooka
 Morley (part)
 Nollamara 
 North Beach 
 Osborne Park (part)
 Scarborough (part)
 Stirling 
 Trigg 
 Tuart Hill 
 Watermans Bay
 Westminster 
 Yokine

In the redistribution that resulted in Stirling's abolition, the suburbs it contained west of the Mitchell Freeway were divided into two. In the north, the suburbs of Carine and Watermans Bay and the northern areas of Gwelup, Karrinyup and Trigg were allocated to Moore, while in the south, the remaining southern portions of Gwelup, Karrinyup and Trigg, along with Stirling's portion of Scarborough, were allocated to Curtin. East of the Mitchell Freeway, the southern fringe of the electorate, containing the suburbs of Joondanna, Tuart Hill and Yokine, along with the southern portion of Dianella, the south-east of Osborne Park, and Stirling's section of Morley, were allocated to Perth. The remainder of the electorate, approximately half of its total area, and including the suburbs of Balcatta, Balga, Hamersley, Mirrabooka, Nollamara, Stirling, and Westminster, along with the northern sections of Dianella and Morley and the north-east of Osborne Park, were allocated to Cowan.

Members

Election results

References

External links
 Division of Stirling - Australian Electoral Commission

Former electoral divisions of Australia
Constituencies established in 1955
1955 establishments in Australia
Federal politics in Western Australia
2022 disestablishments in Australia
Constituencies disestablished in 2022